Dennis Stewart may refer to:

Dennis Stewart (basketball) (born 1947), American professional basketball player
Dennis Stewart (judoka) (born 1960), British judoka
Dennis Cleveland Stewart (1947–1994), American actor and dancer